Jonny Finstad  (born 19 May 1966) is a Norwegian politician. 
He was elected representative to the Storting for the period 2017–2021 for the Conservative Party.

References

1966 births
Living people
Conservative Party (Norway) politicians
Members of the Storting
Nordland politicians